Stacey McGunnigle (born 1985-1987) is a Canadian actress and comedian, most noted as a cast member of the sketch comedy series This Hour Has 22 Minutes since October 2021.

Originally from Alliston, Ontario, McGunnigle first became known as a member of The Second City's national touring company in the early 2010s. In 2012 she joined the mainstage troupe for the first time as a cast member in We've Totally (probably) Got This!. She was the winner of the Canadian Comedy Award for Best Breakout Artist at the 14th Canadian Comedy Awards in 2013, and was a nominee for Best Female Improviser both in 2013 and at the 13th Canadian Comedy Awards in 2012.

In 2014 she was cast in the American sitcom pilot Ellen More or Less, although the show was not picked up to series.

She has also had a regular supporting role in the CBC Gem children's series Detention Adventure, and appeared in episodes of Roast Battle Canada, competing against Hannan Younis in the second episode and against Alan Shane Lewis in the eighth.

References

External links

21st-century Canadian actresses
21st-century Canadian comedians
Canadian television actresses
Canadian film actresses
Canadian sketch comedians
Canadian women comedians
This Hour Has 22 Minutes
Actresses from Ontario
People from Simcoe County
Living people
Canadian Comedy Award winners
1985 births